1971 in the Philippines details events of note that happened in the Philippines in the year 1971.

Incumbents

 President: Ferdinand Marcos (Nacionalista Party)
 Vice President: Fernando Lopez (Nacionalista Party)
House Speaker:
 José Laurel, Jr. (until April 1)
 Cornelio Villareal (starting April 1)
 Chief Justice: Roberto Concepcion
 Congress: 7th

Events

February
 February 1–9 – Diliman commune

April
 April 15 – A Philippine Air Force plane crashes into a rice field near an air base in Pampanga, killing all 40 people on board.

May
 May 1 – The 55th Philippine Constabulary Company (PC), then assigned to the PC's Metropolitan Command (Metrocom), fires into a crowd of students protesting in front of the Philippines' Legislative Building, killing three protesters in what became known as the May Day Massacre.

June
 June 1 – The Constitutional Convention assembles to rewrite the 1935 Constitution. The Convention elects former President Carlos Garcia as its head.
 June 14 – Garcia dies and former President Diosdado Macapagal takes over the top position at the Convention.
 June 19 – Manili massacre

August
 August 21 – The Plaza Miranda bombing occurred during a political campaign rally of the Liberal Party at Plaza Miranda in the district of Quiapo, Manila in the Philippines on August 21, 1971. It caused nine deaths and injured 95 others, including many prominent Liberal Party politicians.
 August 22 – President Marcos suspends the Writ of Habeas Corpus

October
 October 10 – Murder convict and fugitive Leonardo Manecio (Nardong Putik) is killed in a highway shootout with a team from the National Bureau of Investigation in Kawit, Cavite, concluding a massive manhunt against him.

November
 November 8 – Senatorial elections were held in the Philippines. The opposition Liberal Party took 5 seats in the Philippine Senate while 3 seats were taken by the Nacionalista Party, the administration party.

Unknown dates 
 Moro National Liberation Front (MNLF) is formally established by Nur Misuari in an island in Malaysia.

Holidays

As per Act No. 2711 section 29, issued on March 10, 1917, any legal holiday of fixed date falls on Sunday, the next succeeding day shall be observed as legal holiday. Sundays are also considered legal religious holidays. Bonifacio Day was added through Philippine Legislature Act No. 2946. It was signed by then-Governor General Francis Burton Harrison in 1921. On October 28, 1931, the Act No. 3827 was approved declaring the last Sunday of August as National Heroes Day. As per Republic Act No. 3022, April 9th was proclaimed as Bataan Day. Independence Day was changed from July 4 (Philippine Republic Day) to June 12 (Philippine Independence Day) on August 4, 1964.

 January 1 – New Year's Day
 February 22 – Legal Holiday
 April 9:
Maundy Thursday
Araw ng Kagitingan (Day of Valor)
 April 10 – Good Friday
 May 1 – Labor Day
 June 12 – Independence Day 
 July 4 – Philippine Republic Day
 August 13  – Legal Holiday
 August 29 – National Heroes Day
 November 25 – Thanksgiving Day
 November 30 – Bonifacio Day
 December 25 – Christmas Day
 December 30 – Rizal Day

Births
January 21 – Nanette Medved, actress and philanthropist
February 1 – Cathy Yap-Yang, TV business journalist
February 14 – Kris Aquino, Filipina actress and TV host
February 22 – Lea Salonga, Filipina Broadway actress
February 24 – Paolo Abrera, Filipino actor, TV host and commercial model
March 13 – Janet Abuel, lawyer, accountant, and public servant
May 14 – Bernadette Romulo-Puyat, secretary of Tourism
May 16 – Gary Estrada, actor
May 19 – Sylvia Sanchez, actress
May 22 – Raimund Marasigan, rock musician
July 20 – Diego Llorico, comedian
July 21 – Paco Arespacochaga, musician and songwriter
July 23 – Eugene Domingo, Filipino actress
August 2 – Tina Paner, singer and actress
August 7 – Lawrence Fortun, politician
August 12 – Ate Gay, singer and comedian
August 26 – Antonio Trillanes, Senator of the Philippines
September 2 – Arnold Arre, graphic novelist
September  7 –  Melissa de la Cruz  author 
September 16 – Antolin Oreta, politician
October 14 – Robert Jaworski Jr., basketball player
October 19 – Noli Locsin, basketball player
October 27 – Niño Muhlach, actor
November 12 – Joet Garcia, politician
November 13 – Buddy Zabala, musician and producer
November 30 – Bobby Andrews, Filipino actor 
December 13 – Van Partible, Filipino-American animator, writer and producer

Deaths
January 4 – Conrado Benitez, founder of the Philippine Rural Reconstruction Movement
February 16 - Edgar Ang Sinco, student activist
March 4 – Marcial Lichauco, lawyer and diplomat
March 16 – Vivencio Cuyugan, politician, boxer and one of the founders of the Hukbalahap
April 29 – Adelina Gurrea, journalist, poet and playwright
June 14 – Carlos P. Garcia, 8th President of the Philippines
September 5 – Vicente Garces, politician, writer and poet 
October 10 – Nardong Putik, gangster
October 28 – Jesús A. Villamor, Filipino-American pilot

References